Delbar Nazari (born 1958) is an Afghan politician who was the last Minister for Women's Affairs.

Early life and education
Nazari is an Uzbek from Khulm District in Balkh province. She has a degree from the Teachers Training Centre of Balkh and a bachelor's degree in international relations from Kabul University.

Career
Nazari was a teacher and the principal at Naeem Shahid High School in Samangan and worked at Oxfam and UNICEF. She was a member of parliament for Samangan from 2005 to 2010. She worked in the Ministry of the Interior's department for the development of the electronic national ID card.

She was nominated by the team of CEO Abdullah Abdullah for cabinet of the National Unity Government, and was appointed Minister for Women's Affairs in April 2015, one of four women appointed to the cabinet at the time. Nazari's brother works as an advisor at the ministry; she says she needs him as a mahram.

On 13 July 2016, a vote of no confidence in Nazari was brought in the lower house, accusing her of corruption and professional ineffectiveness, one in a long series of such motions against government ministers. The vote was defeated.

In October 2016, Nazari appeared on an all female panel on the BBC program Open Jirga, to discuss issues of equality, despite bomb blasts and attacks in the city the previous day. On 13 December 2016, Nazari told journalists that more than 87% of women in Afghanistan were not safe, saying "Deprivation has caused a lot of threats for women across the country." Her ministry recorded more than 4,000 cases of violence against women in the previous nine months.

References

External links
 Government profile

1958 births
Living people
Afghan Uzbek politicians
21st-century Afghan women politicians
21st-century Afghan politicians
Women government ministers of Afghanistan